Vidyarthi is a surname. Notable people with the surname include:

Ashish Vidyarthi (born 1962), Indian actor
Ganesh Shankar Vidyarthi (1890–1931), Indian journalist and activist
L. P. Vidyarthi (1931–1985), Indian anthropologist
Prabhudayal Vidyarthi (1922-1977), Indian politician

See also
Akhil Bharatiya Vidyarthi Parishad, an Indian student organization